Denis W Field (born 1931), is a male former athlete who competed for England.

Athletics career
He represented England in the triple jump at the 1958 British Empire and Commonwealth Games in Cardiff, Wales.

He was still active for the Sunderland Harriers Athletic Club aged 80 and was a Chairman and President of the Veterans Athletic Association of the North East of England.

References

1931 births
English male triple jumpers
Living people
Athletes (track and field) at the 1958 British Empire and Commonwealth Games
Commonwealth Games competitors for England